Eschatia was an ancient town on the island of Siphnos in what is today Greece. It is attested in ancient inscriptions.

Its site is tentatively located on Siphnos.

References

Populated places in the ancient Aegean islands
Former populated places in Greece
Sifnos